The Game Boy Camera, released as  in Japan, is a Nintendo accessory for the handheld Game Boy game console. It was released on February 21, 1998, in Japan, and manufacturing was ceased in late 2002. As a toy for user-generated content, it can be used to shoot grayscale photographs, edit them or create original drawings, and transfer images between GBC units or to the 64DD art game suite Mario Artist. The accessory featured a 180°-swivel front-facing camera that allowed users to capture selfies. Its images can be printed to thermal paper with the Game Boy Printer. The GBC's cartridge contains minigames based on Nintendo's early games such as the arcade video game Space Fever and the Game & Watch handheld game Ball, and a chiptune music sequencer; photographers have embraced its technological limitations as artistic challenges.

Overview

The Game Boy Camera (GBC) interfaces with the Game Boy Printer, which utilizes thermal paper to print saved images. Both the camera and the printer were marketed by Nintendo as light-hearted entertainment devices aimed mainly at children in all three major video game regions of the world: Japan, North America, and Europe. N64 Magazine (which has since been superseded by NGamer) dedicated a monthly section to the device.

The GBC is compatible with all of the Game Boy line except Game Boy Micro. Video output is possible via the Super Game Boy for the Super NES and the Game Boy Player for the GameCube. The camera has a 128×128 pixel CMOS sensor, and can store 128×112, grayscale digital images using the 4-color palette of the Game Boy system.

The Game Boy Camera line has five different standard colors of models: blue, green, red, yellow, and clear purple (Japan only). There is a limited edition gold themed for The Legend of Zelda: Ocarina of Time, which contains unique stamps, and was available only in the United States through a mail-order offer from Nintendo Power.

In September 2020, information was leaked of an unreleased Hello Kitty version of the camera.

Functionality

The camera is controlled, images are manipulated, and minigames are played by Game Boy software running from the camera's attached cartridge. Individual photographs can be taken and edited with features including a delay timer, time lapse, trick lenses like mirroring and scaling, montage, and panorama for stitching together component photos into one large image. The user can further edit the images by placing Nintendo's stamps, or by freehand doodles. Images can be combined as frames of an animation. Images can be interconnected with clickable hyperlinks in "hot spots" mode.

Images can be transferred via the cable, to be printed on the Game Boy Printer, copied between GBC units, or copied via the Nintendo 64 controller's Transfer Pak to a 64DD floppy disk. The Japanese GBC is optionally integrated into the Mario Artist suite of multimedia games for the 64DD peripheral. There, users can create drawn and 3D-animated avatars of themselves based on photographs taken with the camera, integrate these personalized avatars into various 64DD games including Mario Artist and SimCity 64, or post art on the Internet through Randnet. Third-party vendors have reverse engineered the GBC system to create modern transfer methods such as USB, SD cards and Wi-Fi.

The GBC cartridge's software has numerous references to other Nintendo products. There are a few differences between the North American and Japanese versions, including the unlockable B album pictures and the stamps that can be placed on pictures. The software has a few Easter eggs, some of which have been described as "creepy" and "scary."

Nintendo reportedly had plans to release a successor to the Game Boy Camera for the Game Boy Advance called the GameEye which would take color photos and feature connectivity with the GameCube through a game titled Stage Debut, but neither the GameEye nor Stage Debut were released.

Minigames

Space Fever II is a sequel to the early Nintendo arcade game Space Fever. In this minigame, the player controls a spaceship which fires missiles at other ships throughout three unique levels, followed by a boss at the end of each level. The first boss is a giant face of a man with horns, the second boss is a giant face of a mustachioed man, and the third boss is the Game Face. Once all three of the bosses are beaten, the cycle will restart with increased difficulty. At the beginning of the game, two spaceships appear; shooting the "B" ship will enter the Ball minigame, and shooting the "D" ship will enter DJ. By avoiding both of the ships, the player will begin playing Space Fever II. After scoring 2,000 points there, a new minigame called Run! Run! Run! will be unlocked, where a new ship marked with a "?" will appear at the beginning.
Ball is a juggling game, in which the player moves the hand around to catch and throw balls. It is a variation of the Game & Watch game Ball, only with Mr. Game & Watch's head replaced with the Game Face. The background music to this game is "Mayim Mayim", an Israeli folk song.
DJ is an open-ended music video game with a music sequencer known as Trippy-H where players can mix and create simple chiptunes. The Game Face is the DJ.
Run! Run! Run! is the bonus minigame. The Game Face is attached to a cartoon body, and the player races against a mole and a bird for the finish line. By clearing this minigame in under 22 seconds, the credits are unlocked.

Development

Initially, the Game Boy Camera was not well received within Nintendo. However, Masato Kuwahara approached Creatures, Inc. President Hirokazu Tanaka regarding the development of the software for the device, which solidified the project. The camera's built-in software was co-developed by Nintendo Research & Development 1 and the Japanese company Jupiter, with Tanaka directing the project. The Game Boy Camera was launched with an initial MSRP of 49.95.

Legacy

The Camera sold close to 500,000 units in its first three weeks of availability in Japan.

As one of the earliest consumer digital cameras, the GBC has been legitimized for user-generated content, especially photography. Modern computer connectivity has required experimentation for image retrieval.

In 2000, a professional photographer created a color workflow similar to the world's earliest color photography, to process GBC's grayscale photos through red, green, and blue filters to produce a color photograph. An artist using a Game Boy Camera and three colour process has developed a series of works since 2012, focussing on how the interplay between what the abstracted images reveal and conceal about the photographed environment. As well as using the Game Boy printer within his practice. A PhD student performed astrophotography of scenes including Jupiter, through academic telescopes using GBC. In 2017, a research engineer developed a neural network application to automatically convert GBC monochrome images into color images. Several modern smartphone apps have modes to simulate GBC image quality. In 2016, an Instagram artist included the vintage GBC hardware in his repertoire of high-technology stylized filters, creating a new gallery dedicated only to GBC photography, because its primitive camera "forces you to find a way to take beautiful pictures".

See also
Game Boy Pocket Sonar
Mario Paint (1992), a Super NES art game
Mario no Photopi (1998), a Nintendo 64 art game for editing and printing photos from digital cameras
Miiverse, Nintendo's former global online art community

Notes

References

1998 video games
Game Boy games
Game Boy-only games
Minigame compilations
Nintendo games
Products introduced in 1998
Digital cameras
Game Boy accessories
Games with Transfer Pak support
Photography games
Shoot 'em ups
Video games developed in Japan